Bishop Agniswamy College of Education is a self-financed college of education in Muttom in the Kanyakumari District of Tamil Nadu in Southern India. It is administered by the Bishop of the Roman Catholic Diocese of Kottar and is affiliated with Tamil Nadu Teachers Education University, Chennai. Its motto is "Arise! Shine!".

In 2007, it recorded an annual intake of 100 students and was recognized by the Indian National Council for Teacher Education.

See also
 List of teacher education schools in India
They offering both B.Ed and M.Ed Courses.

References

External links
 Official website: Bishop Agniswamy College of Education

Catholic universities and colleges in India
Colleges of education in Tamil Nadu
Universities and colleges in Kanyakumari district